Munt la Schera (2,587 m) is a mountain of the Ortler Alps, located south of Il Fuorn (east of Zernez) in the canton of Graubünden.

References

External links
 Munt la Schera on Hikr

Mountains of the Alps
Mountains of Graubünden
Ortler Alps
Mountains of Switzerland
Two-thousanders of Switzerland
Zernez